Mount Tripyramid is a mountain located in Grafton County, New Hampshire. Part of the Sandwich Range of the White Mountains, it has three distinct peaks – North, Middle, and South – along its mile-long summit ridge. Scaur Peak and The Fool Killer are subsidiary peaks to the northwest and northeast. To the southeast, Tripyramid is flanked by The Sleepers.

Mt. Tripyramid is drained on the west side by Slide Brook and Avalanche Brook, thence into the Mad River, Pemigewasset River, Merrimack River, and into the Gulf of Maine at Newburyport, Massachusetts. Tripyramid is drained on the east side by Sabbaday Brook, thence into the Swift River, Saco River, and into the Gulf of Maine at Saco, Maine. Tripyramid is drained on the north side by Pine Bend Brook, another tributary of the Swift River.

Both North and Middle Tripyramid are included in the Appalachian Mountain Club's list of New England "four-thousand footers".  Although over 4,000 feet in height, South Tripyramid is not, because it lacks topographic prominence, being less than 200 ft above the col on the ridge from Middle Tripyramid.

See also

 List of mountains in New Hampshire
 White Mountain National Forest

References

External links
 
 
 "Hiking the Tripyramids". Appalachian Mountain Club.
 "Mt. Tripyramid (North Peak)". FranklinSites.com Hiking Guide.
 "Mt. Tripyramid (Middle Peak)". FranklinSites.com Hiking Guide.
 "Mt. Tripyramid (South Peak)". FranklinSites.com Hiking Guide.
  Mt. Tripyramid. HikeTheWhites.com.

Mountains of New Hampshire
Mountains of Grafton County, New Hampshire
New England Four-thousand footers